Fishguard Bay (Welsh: Bae Abergwaun) is a bay on the north Pembrokeshire coast, Wales. Much of the bay's coastline is within the Pembrokeshire Coast National Park though the developed areas of Fishguard and Goodwick are excluded. Fronting onto the much larger Cardigan Bay, it stretches from Dinas Island (actually a peninsula) to Crincoed Point, three miles to the west. Several smaller inlets pierce its southern shore whilst in the southwest it has been developed as Fishguard Harbour. The small sandy bay of Pwllgwaelod is located at its eastern extremity. The Pembrokeshire Coast Path, itself a part of the longer Wales Coast Path runs around the bay, taking a slight detour inland along its western side.

References

Cardigan Bay
Bays of the Irish Sea
Bays of Pembrokeshire
Bays of Wales